Regba is a moshav shitufi in northern Israel. Located near Nahariya, it falls under the jurisdiction of Mateh Asher Regional Council.

History
Regba was established in 1946 next to the Palestinian Arab villages of Al-Sumayriyya and Mazra'a, by a group of veterans of the British Army from Germany, the Netherlands and English speaking countries. It was originally established as a kibbutz and became a moshav shitufi in 1949. The name is symbolic, as in "Regev" ("lump of earth").

Landmarks
Regba Center for Olive and Oil, originally located at the Shemen factory in Haifa Bay, documents the history of the country's olive industry.

Notable residents

 Eyal Berkovic (born 1972), football player

References

Dutch-Jewish culture in Israel
German-Jewish culture in Israel
Moshavim
Kibbutz Movement
Populated places established in 1946
Populated places in Northern District (Israel)
1946 establishments in Mandatory Palestine